Herman Petersen (13 December 171313 August 1765) was a Swedish merchant.

Biography 
Herman Petersen was born on 13 December 1713 to Abraham Petersen, a wholesaler in Gothenburg and his wife Christina Tham.
He was elected to serve as director of the Swedish East India Company for a period during the 18th century.
Petersen traded great amounts of copper with France. He did so with his company Petersen & Bedoire, that he had started with his brother-in-law, Fredrik Bedoire. 
Petersen was a member of the so called Skeppsbroadel.

Petersen was one of the wealthiest men in Sweden during the 18th century, and with all of his money, he bought several estates that still lasts in the family as of today. 

His children were raised to peerage after he had died. A nobiliary particle "af" were added to their surname. In 1741, he married Magdalena Bedoire, and in 1753 her cousin, Charlotta Bedoire.

See also 

 Erstavik
 Petersen House (Sweden)

References

Further reading 

 

1713 births
1765 deaths
18th-century Swedish businesspeople
Swedish East India Company people
Swedish people of German descent
18th-century Swedish landowners
People from Gothenburg